The 2014 Ukrainian local elections took place on 25 May 2014, four years after the conclusion of the last local elections, which took place in October 2010. The elections occurred during the political crisis in the aftermath of the 2014 Ukrainian revolution.

Although the Verkhovna Rada did not schedule early local elections for entire Ukraine, it announced early elections in a number of places throughout Ukraine, including mayoral elections for some large cities, such as Odesa and 2014 Kyiv local election.

Overall, mayoral elections occurred in 43 cities, 27 settlements, and 200 villages, in addition to 2 city council and 3 village council elections, throughout 14 of Ukraine's 24 oblasts, and were also scheduled to take place in the Autonomous Republic of Crimea.  No Ukrainian mayoral or council elections took place in the Crimea, however, as, in March 2014 it was unilaterally annexed by Russia.

In June 2014, the Verkhovna Rada scheduled early mayoral elections for ten additional cities to be held on October 26, 2014.

Changes in the law
On April 8, 2014, the Ukrainian parliament passed a new law regarding the local elections in the country. The new law allows local elections to be conducted concurrently with presidential elections. It also formalized the status of election observers, officially making them a part of the electoral process, and expanding their rights and authority. The new law also provides for the creation of territorial election commissions, provisions for removing local election officials before the end of their term, and changes to how the country's central election commission leadership is appointed.

On April 10, the parliament proposed to amend the local elections law to require a runoff vote for mayoral elections in cities with populations over 500,000, such as Kyiv and Odesa, but the proposal failed a vote in parliament.

Election locations

The Verkhovna Rada, the parliament of the Ukraine, scheduled the elections for Kyiv's mayor and city council for 25 May 2014, which were contested concurrently with the country's presidential election.

In late February, the parliament announced early mayoral elections for 27 cities throughout Ukraine:

 Chernivtsi, Chernivtsi Oblast
 Kherson, Kherson Oblast
 Mykolaiv, Mykolaiv Oblast
 Odesa, Odesa Oblast
 Okhtyrka, Sumy Oblast
 Nizhyn, Chernihiv Oblast
 Saky, Autonomous Republic of Crimea
 Fastiv, Kyiv Oblast
 Feodosia, Autonomous Republic of Crimea
 Netishyn, Khmelnytskyi Oblast
 Lysychansk, Luhansk Oblast
 Rovenky, Luhansk Oblast
 Kaniv, Cherkasy Oblast
 Pershotravensk, Dnipropetrovsk Oblast
 Snizhne, Donetsk Oblast
 Khrystynivka, Cherkasy Oblast
 Verkhnodniprovsk, Dnipropetrovsk Oblast
 Bilopillia, Sumy Oblast
 Barvinkove, Kharkiv Oblast
 Kamianka, Cherkasy Oblast
 Zbarazh, Ternopil Oblast
 Kremenets, Ternopil Oblast
 Zboriv, Ternopil Oblast
 Rodynske, Donetsk Oblast
 Perevalsk, Luhansk Oblast
 Zhmerynka, Vinnytsia Oblast

On March 15, the Verkhovna Rada announced early elections for 228 localities throughout the country for 25 May 2014. In addition, the parliament also announced early elections for five mayors throughout the country:

 Pereiaslav-Khmelnytskyi, Kyiv Oblast
 Rozhysche, Volyn Oblast
 Piatykhatky, Dnipropetrovsk Oblast
 Monastyryska, Ternopil Oblast
 Khotyn, Chernivtsi Oblast

On March 17, the parliament announced early elections for the Cherkasy City Council.

On March 25, the deadline for announcing early elections according to the Ukraine's electoral law, the Verkhovna Rada announced mayoral elections for 10 additional cities throughout the country:

 Sumy
 Vasylkiv, Kyiv Oblast
 Pryluky, Chernihiv Oblast
 Antratsyt, Luhansk Oblast
 Zhovti Vody, Dnipropetrovsk Oblast
 Romny, Sumy Oblast
 Ladyzhyn, Vinnytsia Oblast
 Bobrynets, Kirovohrad Oblast
 Baturyn, Chernihiv Oblast
 Korsun-Shevchenkivskyi, Cherkasy Oblast

Results
Vitali Klitschko won the mayoral election in Kyiv with almost 57% of the votes, while his party the Ukrainian Democratic Alliance for Reform won 73 of the 120 seats in the Kyiv City Council.

In Odesa Gennadiy Trukhanov defeated Eduard Gurvits with 43.39% against 32,02% in the mayoral election.

In Mykolaiv Acting Mayor Yuriy Hranaturov kept this post with 28,29%. Hranaturov was an independent candidate, but former Party of Regions member until a few months for the election.

In Kherson Acting Mayor and Batkivshchyna member Volodymyr Mykolayenko won the mayoral elections in with 35.93%.

In Sumy (also) Acting Mayor and (also) Batkivshchyna member Oleksandr Lysenko won the mayoral elections in with 41,07%.

The Central Election Commission of Ukraine ordered a re-count in Cherkasy by a new local Election Commission on 4 June 2014 because of "systematic and gross violations of the law".

Communist Party of Ukraine candidate Valentin Demyanchuk won the mayoral election in Piatykhatky, Dnipropetrovsk Oblast with 27% of the vote.

Notes

References

External links
 

2014
2014 elections in Ukraine
Euromaidan
May 2014 events in Ukraine